The 1921–22 Michigan State Normal Normalites men's basketball team represented the Michigan State Normal School, now Eastern Michigan University, in the 1921–22 NCAA men's basketball season. The team finished with a record of 11–6 and were the runner-up for the Michigan Intercollegiate Athletic Association Championship. The team was led by first year head coach Joseph H. McCulloch. Williams was the team captain.

Roster
Osborne – Center
Burrell – Center
Williams – Right forward
Williamson – Center
Dillon – Forward
Clark
Dickie
Deakin – Guard
Champney
Davidson – Forward

Awards
Osborne was named All MIAA center.

Schedule

|-
!colspan=9 style="background:#006633; color:#FFFFFF;"| Non-conference regular season

1. Media guide list score as 29-27. Aurora list score as 28-23.

References

Eastern Michigan Eagles men's basketball seasons
Michigan State Normal
1921 in sports in Michigan
1922 in sports in Michigan